Liquidizer is the debut album by British rock band Jesus Jones. It was released in 1989 on SBK Records. "Info Freako", "Never Enough" and "Bring It on Down" were released as singles. Although "Move Mountains" was never released as a single, it received regular airplay on the Los Angeles radio station KROQ, making the KROQ Top 106.7 Countdown for that year.

Background
In December 1979, a band featuring guitarist Mike Edwards and drummer Simon "Gen" Mathews held their first rehearsal. In February 1980, Mike Palmer was drafted in as their vocalist, and after a few months, Edwards became adamant about having a career in music. After finishing school, Edwards and Palmer went to London to hand out demo tapes to A&R departments at potential record labels. Edwards would leave the band by mid-1983; he spent several months working on material alone before deciding to form a new act with Gen and Palmer. Since they lacked a bassist, Edwards contacted a local representative from a Musicians' Union, who knew of bass-playing son of a friend of his. Al Doughty, whose musicianship impressed the rest of the band, subsequently showed up to rehearsals. As they wished to succeed with the band, the members decided on moving to London. During this time, Palmer became disenchanted with how long the process was taking and the lack of fortunes.

Two weeks before the planned relocation to London, Palmer left the band. Edwards, who had started doing backing vocals alongside his guitar playing, became the new vocalist. He struggled initially, to the point where Doughty suggested recruiting a female singer that he was aware of. In January 1985, they moved into a flat in the Walthamstow area of London. The trio found it difficult to secure gigs as promoters were not interested in the band, prompting them to take on "pay to play" engagements. Edwards found his bandmates competent musicians, but was critical of his own songwriting, referring to it as aimless. He continued to work on possible ideas using his Portastudio equipment. While this occurred, Doughty moved into the house of a former classmate, who joined them as a keyboardist. After two months, said person left as them and Edwards had differing personalities. Another keyboardist, from friends they made in East London, joined but left after two practices.

As this was the time period of the proliferation indie bands, such as the Jesus and Mary Chain and the Smiths, it dawned on Edwards that they should instead bring in another guitarist. Edwards and Gen relocated to Willesden, and shortly after, they put an advert in Melody Maker looking for a guitar player. Edwards said they received two responses: one from an "overweight guy of Cypriot descent" who "didn't seem all that interested", and the other from Jerry de Borg. Despite the poor sound in the room they held an audition in, which meant they were unable to hear what Borg was playing, he formally joined the band. Around the time he was discovering hip hop and sampling, Edwards' interest in skateboarding saw him practice at skateparks throughout London. Ghetto blasters at these locales allowed him to discover more music, such as the work of Age of Chance and Beastie Boys in 1986, and later acid house in 1988. He said that "enough originality was about to inspire" his songwriting, which coincided with him receiving a drum machine from a friend of Borg.

Development and recording
Edwards saw an advert for a sampler in Loot in May 1988, which in reality was a "glorified echo pedal" with a maximum sampling time of two seconds. Despite the limitation, which he was able to extended with the tape-speed control on his Portastudio, it aided his creativity. Discussing the musical direction, Edwards highlighted the work of Age of Chance, Pop Will Eat Itself and the Shamen as for what he was aiming for. Inspired by the live sound of the Shamen, Ewards set about changing his band's live setup, with the inclusion of a drum trigger. While his love of making music was at a high point, he had considerably less interest in trying to promote it. As a result of their mutual pastime in skateboarding, Edwards met Iain Baker, who would later become their keyboardist. Gen stepped up in a managerial role, organising gigs and would approach managers of other bands in the hopes of taking them on. While on a holiday in Spain, Borg, Edwards and Gen christened the band Jesus Jones.

Three months after returning home, Gen borrowed a half-complete demo of "Info Freako"; sometime later, Edwards was contacted by Andy Ross of Dave Balfe Management. Ross told him that he was involved with Food Records and invited Edwards for a meeting. They subsequently signed a recording contract with the label in December 1988 for a single, with the option for a second single and an album. As talk of the band made its way through the music industry, a queue would form for their next show in January 1989 that wrapped around a city block. Over the next few weeks, the band's gigs sold out as they started received coverage from the music press. The band members left their day jobs in order to support the Shamen and the Wonder Stuff on their respective tours.

Release
"Info Freako" was released as the lead single from Liquidizer in February 1989, with "Broken Bones" and an alternative version of "Info Freako" titled "Info Sicko" as its B-sides. A remixed version of "Info Freako", renamed "Info Psycho (Dance Extravaganza)", was released as a twelve-inch vinyl record, with "Info Sicko" and "Info Freako" as its B-sides. "Never Enough" was released as the second single from the album, with "What's Going On", "It's the Winning That Counts" and an alternative version of "Never Enough" titled "Enough – Never Enough" as the B-sides.

"Bring It on Down" was released as the second single from the album, with "None of the Answers", "Cut and Dried" and "Beat It Down" as the B-sides. A remixed version of "Bring It on Down", subtitled "liquidized mix", was released as a twelve-inch vinyl record, with "Cut and Dried" and "Info Sicko" as its B-sides. The Food Christmas EP 1989 was released in 1989; it featured Jesus Jones covering "I Don't Want That Kind of Love" by Crazyhead, while Diesel Park West covered "Info Freako".

Reissues and related releases
Liquidizer was released in the United States through SBK Records on 4 June 1990.<ref> In the Search for box enter Liquidizer, select Title then click Begin Search.</ref> It was re-pressed on vinyl through Demon Records in 2022. A two-CD and DVD set was released in 2014, collecting various B-sides, remixes and live performances. The regular version of the album, alongside 2014 bonus material and the addition of more demos, was included on the career-spanning box set Some of the Answers in 2022. The band performed the album in its entirety for a one-off show in 2013 to commemorate the closure of Bull & Gate. It was filmed and released as a CD-and-DVD set that same year. In 2019, the band re-recorded four of the album's tracks, namely "Move Mountains", "All the Answers", "Bring It on Down" and "Someone to Blame", for release as the EP Liquidizer 2019.

"Never Enough", "What's Going On", "Info Freako", "Bring It on Down" and "One for the Money" were featured on the compilation album The Greatest (1998). "Never Enough", "All the Answers", "Info Freako" and "Bring It on Down" were included on the compilation Never Enough (The Best of Jesus Jones) (2002). "Move Mountains", "The Real World", "Song 13" and "Too Much to Learn" were featured on the compilation The Collection – A Selection of Band Favourites and Rarities (2011). "Move Mountains", "Never Enough", "All the Answers", "Song 13", "Info Freako" and "Bring It on Down" were featured on the compilation Zeroes and Ones – The Best Of (2011).

ReceptionTrouser Press wrote that "the band’s superior melodic intent to stylistic soulmates Pop Will Eat Itself resulted in a jacked-up blend that worked for both the ears and the feet." The Chicago Tribune wrote that Jesus Jones incorporate "some of the most sophisticated and subtle samples to appear on record." The Rolling Stone Album Guide'' called the album "a hodgepodge of stale ingredients in a bland, if colorful, casing."

The album peaked at #32 in the UK album chart.

Track listing
All songs written by Mike Edwards, except where noted.

 "Move Mountains" – 3:20
 "Never Enough" – 2:41
 "The Real World" – 3:03
 "All the Answers" – 3:48
 "What's Going On" – 3:04
 "Song 13" – 4:05
 "Info Freako" – 2:51
 "Bring It on Down" – 2:31
 "Too Much to Learn" – 3:02
 "What Would You Know?" – 3:55
 "One for the Money" – 2:56
 "Someone to Blame" – 4:07

Bonus tracks
"Broken Bones"* – 3:06
 "I Don't Want That Kind of Love"** (Kevin Bayliss) – 4:10

* Added for the original 1989 US CD Release
** Added for the original 1989 US/JPN CD Release

Personnel
Jesus Jones
Jesus H. Jones (Mike Edwards) - vocals, guitar
Jerry De Borg - guitar
Al Jaworski - bass
Simon "Gen" Mathews - drums, samples
Barry D - samples

"This is the first Jesus Jones Album and is a diary of the band conception to...This! Liquidizer was made under the influence of: Turntable Orchestra, The Byrds, Napalm Death, The Shamen, Neneh Cherry, Star Trek, Public Enemy, Mel and Kim, Sonic Youth, Bomb The Bass, Rapeman, Todd Terry, Cookie Crew, Prince, Allen Konigsberg, S'Express, World Domination Enterprises, Sonny Boy Williamson, Jimi Hendrix, The Jungle Brothers, Them Mysterious Bulgarian Voices, Head Of David, For A Few Dollars More, A Guy Called Gerald, Malcolm Young, Leigh "Scratch" Fenlon, Dinosaur Jnr, Sweet T, Joe Smooth, Black Sabbath, De La Soul, Faith No More, Erik B + Rakim, Apocalypse Now, The The, Big Black, The Evil Dead and the news and views of 1988 / 1989."

References
Citations

Sources

 

Jesus Jones albums
1989 debut albums
Albums produced by Craig Leon
Food Records albums
SBK Records albums
Grebo (music) albums